

Gmina Osiek is a rural gmina (administrative district) in Oświęcim County, Lesser Poland Voivodeship, in southern Poland. Its seat is the village of Osiek; it also contains the village of Głębowice.

Neighbouring gminas
Gmina Osiek is bordered by the gminas of Kęty, Oświęcim, Polanka Wielka and Wieprz.

References
Polish official population figures 2006

Osiek
Gmina Osiek